Similiparma is a genus of ray-finned fish in the damselfish and clownfish family, Pomacentridae.

Species
The following two species are recognised in the genus Similiparma:

References

Pomacentrinae